Marlene Steinherr (born 10 September 1985) is a German sailor specializing in the 470 (dinghy) class. She represented Germany, along with partner Annika Bochmann, in the women's 470 class at the 2016 Summer Olympics in Rio de Janeiro. They finished in 18th place.

References 

1985 births
Living people
German female sailors (sport)
Olympic sailors of Germany
Sailors at the 2016 Summer Olympics – 470